Batyrevsky District (Patăryel rayonĕ) is an administrative and municipal district (raion), one of the twenty-one in the Chuvash Republic, Russia. It is located in the southeast of the republic and borders with Komsomolsky and Ibresinsky Districts in the north, Yalchiksky District in the east, Shemurshinsky District and the Republic of Tatarstan in the south, and with Alatyrsky District in the west. Its administrative center is the rural locality (a selo) of Batyrevo. Population:  The population of Batyrevo accounts for 14.1% of the district's total population.

History
The district was formed on September 5, 1927.

Demographics
The Chuvash account for about 75% of the district's population and the Tatars account for 22%.

References

Notes

Sources

Districts of Chuvashia